Khobz Mbesses (Arabic: خبز مبسّس ) is an Algerian cake usually made with semolina or farina.

See also
 List of cakes
 Algerian cuisine
 

Arab cuisine
Algerian desserts
North African cuisine